Eleven ships of the Royal Navy have borne the name HMS Crescent:
  was a 14-gun ship purchased in 1643.  She was captured in 1648 by the Royalists and wrecked in 1649.
  was a 6-gun fireship, formerly of the French navy.
  was a 32-gun fifth rate.  She was formerly the French privateer Rostan, which HMS Torbay captured in 1758.  Crescent was sold in 1777.
  was a 28-gun sixth rate launched in 1779, that the French captured off Cadiz in 1781.
  was a 36-gun fifth rate launched in 1784 and wrecked off Jutland in 1808.
  was a 38-gun fifth rate launched in 1810, reassigned to harbour service in 1840 and sold in 1854.
  was a wood paddle tender purchased in 1854, and sold in 1855.
  was an  first class cruiser launched in 1892.  She was sold in 1921.
  was a C-class destroyer launched in 1931, but transferred to the Royal Canadian Navy in 1937 and renamed .
  was a  destroyer launched in 1944 and transferred on loan to the Royal Canadian Navy in 1945.  She was bought outright by the Canadians in 1951 and converted into a frigate in 1956.  She was paid off in 1970 and broken up in 1971.

Royal Navy ship names